Qeshlaq-e Seyyed Naser (also Romanized as Qeshlāq-e Seyyed Nāşer) is a village in Hojr Rural District, in the Central District of Sahneh County, Kermanshah Province, Iran. At the 2006 census, its population was 139, in 34 families.

References 

Populated places in Sahneh County